Yohann Laurent Mercier (born 15 December 1980) is a footballer from New Caledonia. He plays as a Defence and has played football with ACB Poya since 2007. He previously played for JS Baco.

External links 

1980 births
Living people
New Caledonian footballers
New Caledonia international footballers
2008 OFC Nations Cup players
Association football defenders